Nouvelles de la république des lettres (News from the Republic of Letters) was a periodical devoted to reviews of current publications, edited and in large part written by Pierre Bayle. It began publication in 1684, and is the first known book review journal.

Bayle edited it from  March 1684  through February 1687; it was continued by Daniel de Larroque, Jean Barrin and Jean Le Clerc through April 1689. Publication was suspended from then until January 1699 when it was resumed under the editorship of  Jacques Bernard. He continued it through December 1710; it was then suspended until January 1716, when he resumed and continued until the final issue in June 1718.

Although written in French, it was  published in Amsterdam to escape French censorship. The initial publisher was Henri Desbordes from 1684 through 1689 and 1699 through May 1708, and subsequently by Pierre Mortier from June 1708 through December 1710, and David Mortier from January 1716 through June 1718.

Publication was monthly from the beginning through 1710; after that, it was published bi-monthly.

A reproduction was published in Geneva by Slatkine in 1966.

References

External links
Le gazetier universel (digital resources on antique press) :
 Nouvelles de la République des Lettres first series (1684-1718)
 Nouvelles de la République des Lettres second series (1775-1777)

Nouvelles de la république des lettres on Google (University of Michigan) :
 Mars-May 1684
 June-August 1684
 September-December 1684

1684 establishments in the Dutch Republic
Bi-monthly magazines published in the Netherlands
Book review magazines
Defunct literary magazines published in Europe
Defunct magazines published in the Netherlands
French-language magazines
Literary criticism
Magazines established in 1684
Magazines disestablished in 1718
Magazines published in Amsterdam
Monthly magazines published in the Netherlands